The 1991–92 Magyar Kupa (English: Hungarian Cup) was the 52nd season of Hungary's annual knock-out cup football competition.

Quarter-finals

|}

Semi-finals

|}

Final

See also
 1991–92 Nemzeti Bajnokság I

References

External links
 Official site 
 soccerway.com

1991–92 in Hungarian football
1991–92 domestic association football cups
1991-92